PGK may refer to:

Papua New Guinean kina, the currency of Papua New Guinea by ISO 4217 code
Pasukan Gerakan Khas, a Malaysian police special operations unit
Phosphoglycerate kinase, an enzyme
XM1156 Precision Guidance Kit, a U.S. Army program for artillery shells
Depati Amir Airport, Indonesia